Crassispira apicata is a species of sea snail, a marine gastropod mollusk in the family Pseudomelatomidae.

Description
The length of the shell varies between 7 mm and 20 mm.

The whorls are concavely flattened above a fine keel, nodosely plaited beneath, plaits fading away towards the lower part.  Transversely the shell is impressly striated. The color of the shell is chocolate brown or pale yellow, reddish at the apex.

Distribution
This marine species occurs from Colombia to Northern Brazil; also off the Virgin Islands.; fossils have been found in Early Pliocene strata of Venezuela.

References

 Fallon P.J. (2011) Descriptions and illustrations of some new and poorly known turrids (Gastropoda: Turridae) of the tropical northwestern Atlantic. Part 3. Genus Crassispira Swainson, 1840, subgenus Crassiclava McLean, 1971. The Nautilus 125(2): 53–62.
 B. Landau and C. Marques da Silva. 2010. Early Pliocene gastropods of Cubagua, Venezuela: Taxonomy, palaeobiogeography and ecostratigraphy. Palaeontos 19:1–221

External links
 
 
 De Jong K.M. & Coomans H.E. (1988) Marine gastropods from Curaçao, Aruba and Bonaire. Leiden: E.J. Brill. 261 pp. 

apicata
Gastropods described in 1845